Dobrudzha Glacier is situated on the southeast side of Tangra Mountains, Burgas Peninsula, eastern Livingston Island in the South Shetland Islands, northeast of Magura Glacier, southeast of Iskar Glacier and southwest of Ropotamo Glacier. It is bounded by Ruse Peak and Asen Peak to the north and by Kuber Peak to the west and flows southeastward into Bransfield Strait.  The glacier is named after the Dobrudzha region in northeastern Bulgaria.

Location

See also
 List of glaciers in the Antarctic
 Glaciology

Maps
 L.L. Ivanov et al. Antarctica: Livingston Island and Greenwich Island, South Shetland Islands. Scale 1:100000 topographic map. Sofia: Antarctic Place-names Commission of Bulgaria, 2005.
 L.L. Ivanov. Antarctica: Livingston Island and Greenwich, Robert, Snow and Smith Islands. Scale 1:120000 topographic map.  Troyan: Manfred Wörner Foundation, 2009.

References

Bibliography 
Dobrudzha Glacier. SCAR Composite Antarctic Gazetteer
 Bulgarian Antarctic Gazetteer. Antarctic Place-names Commission. (details in Bulgarian, basic data in English)

External links
 Dobrudzha Glacier. Copernix satellite image

Glaciers of Livingston Island